The Temple of the Six Banyan Trees or Liurong Temple is a Buddhist temple in Guangzhou, China, originally built in AD 537.

The temple's proximity to foreign consulates in Guangzhou has made it a regular destination for families participating in the international adoption of children from China. Typically families receive blessings for their newly adopted children at this temple in front of the statue of Guanyin.

History
The Baozhuangyan Temple was first constructed by the monk Tanyu under orders from Emperor Wu of the Liang in AD 537. It was constructed to house the relics of Cambodian Buddhist saints which had been brought to Panyu (modern Guangzhou).

The temple was burned down and rebuilt during the Northern Song dynasty. Around the same time, Su Shi composed a poem "Six Banyans" (Liu Rong) in honor of a visit to the temple. It was since renamed in honor of the famous poem. 

Flower Pagoda, the main structure of the temple, was built in 1097 and was named for its colorful exterior. The Flower Pagoda once had a square base in its architecture, but was given an octagonal shaped base after it was rebuilt in 1097. It was rebuilt again in 1373 after another fire in the early Ming dynasty period and restored in 1900.

See also
 Chinese Buddhism
 List of Buddhist temples
 Guangxiao Temple (Guangzhou)
 Hualin Temple (Guangzhou)
 Ocean Banner Temple

External links
 Temple of the Six Banyan Trees at travelchinaguide.com

537 establishments
6th-century establishments in China
Religious buildings and structures completed in 1097
11th-century Buddhist temples
Religious buildings and structures completed in 1373
14th-century Buddhist temples
Religious organizations established in the 6th century
Buddhist temples in Guangzhou
Yuexiu District
Pagodas in China
Ming dynasty architecture
6th-century Buddhist temples
Major National Historical and Cultural Sites in Guangdong